The Turvo River is a river of São Paulo state in southeastern Brazil. It is a tributary of the Grande River, which it joins in the reservoir formed by Água Vermelha Dam.

See also
 List of rivers of São Paulo
 List of tributaries of the Río de la Plata

References

 Brazilian Ministry of Transport

Rivers of São Paulo (state)